Robert L. Short (1932 – July 6, 2009) was an American Christian minister and the author of several books of "popular theology", including
the 1965 bestseller The Gospel According to Peanuts.

Life and career
Short was born and raised in Midland, Texas. He attended the University of Oklahoma and received a B.A. He then earned a Master of Divinity degree from Perkins School of Theology at Southern Methodist University. For the next few years, Short worked as a professional actor, appearing in commercial and religious television, and also directed religious drama. He continued his education, receiving a M.A. in English from North Texas University.

In 1963, Short moved to Chicago, where he met his wife, Ellen Kay Coale, and received an M.A. in theology and literature from the University of Chicago. He subsequently engaged in graduate studies in systematic theology at Garrett–Evangelical Theological Seminary at Northwestern University. He and his wife settled in Wilmette, Illinois, where they raised three children.

In 1965, Short published his first book, The Gospel According to Peanuts, which used examples from the popular comic strip Peanuts to explain points of Christian theology. It was an immediate success, and was the best-selling non-fiction book in the U.S. for the year. As of 2012 it had sold over 10 million copies in the U.S. The book followed his article, "The Penultimate Peanuts", published in Motive Magazine in October 1963.

Seven additional books followed. Of The Parables of Peanuts (1968), Peanuts creator Charles M. Schulz wrote, "This new book is filled with wonderful quotes and is a real delight from beginning to end. Actually, I could not possibly be more pleased."

Later books included A Time to Be Born–A Time to Die (1973), The Gospel from Outer Space (1983), Short Meditations on the Bible and Peanuts (1990), The Gospel According to Dogs: What Our Four-Legged Saints Can Teach Us (2007), and The Parables of Dr. Seuss (2008).

The success of his books led to a second career as a speaker, teacher, and guest preacher at churches, schools, and seminaries around the world. He also wrote many articles for magazines, and was a frequent contributor to Motive Magazine, which published his first article on Peanuts.

In 1991 Short was ordained as a minister of the Presbyterian Church, and became associate pastor and "theologian in residence" of the First Presbyterian Church of Brighton, Michigan. He later became head of staff and pastor, specializing in preaching, adult Christian education and confirmation instruction. In 1996, he became minister of the First Presbyterian Church of Monticello, Arkansas.

In 2001, Short moved to Little Rock, Arkansas, where he started a new church of his own: "the Church of the Gospel of JESUS (Jesus Exclusively Secured Unconditional Salvation)", or "Christianity Without Doom and Gloom".

Short died on July 6, 2009, in Little Rock.

Works

See also
 Bartholomew Cubbins

References

1932 births
2009 deaths
20th-century American writers
20th-century Protestant religious leaders
21st-century American writers
21st-century Protestant religious leaders
Christian writers
People from Brighton, Michigan
People from Midland, Texas
Presbyterian Church (USA) teaching elders
Writers from Little Rock, Arkansas
Writers from Michigan
Writers from Texas
20th-century American clergy
21st-century American clergy